The 1966 Giro d'Italia was the 49th running of the Giro d'Italia, one of cycling's Grand Tour races. The Giro started in Monaco's Monte Carlo, on 18 May, with a  stage and concluded in Trieste, on 8 June, with a  leg. A total of 100 riders from 13 teams entered the 22-stage race, which was won by Italian Gianni Motta of the Molteni team. The second and third places were taken by Italian Italo Zilioli and Frenchman Jacques Anquetil, respectively.

The points classification was introduced in this edition.

Teams

A total of 10 teams were invited to participate in the 1966 Giro d'Italia. Each team sent a squad of ten riders, so the Giro began with a peloton of 100 cyclists. Out of the 100 riders that started this edition of the Giro d'Italia, a total of 83 riders made it to the finish in Trieste.

The 10 teams that took part in the race were:

Route and stages

The race route was revealed to the public on 21 February 1966 by race director Vincenzo Torriani. With Monaco hosting the Grande Partenza, it was the second consecutive year, and second time in race history, the race started in a foreign country.

Classification leadership

One jersey was worn during the 1966 Giro d'Italia. The leader of the general classification – calculated by adding the stage finish times of each rider – wore a pink jersey. This classification is the most important of the race, and its winner is considered as the winner of the Giro.

For the points classification, which awarded no jersey to its leader, cyclists were given points for finishing a stage in the top 15. The classification was also known as the Trofeo Uomo Dreher. The mountains classification leader. The climbs were ranked in first and second categories. In this ranking, points were won by reaching the summit of a climb ahead of other cyclists. Although no jersey was awarded, there was also one classification for the teams, in which the stage finish times of the best three cyclists per team were added; the leading team was the one with the lowest total time.

Final standings

General classification

Mountains classification

Points classification

Teams classification

References

Footnotes

Citations

1966
Giro d'Italia
Giro d'Italia
Giro d'Italia
Giro d'Italia
1966 Super Prestige Pernod